The Muppets Go Hollywood is a one-hour television special that promoted The Muppet Movie, the first theatrical film in The Muppets franchise. It first aired May 16, 1979 on CBS, six weeks before the American release of The Muppet Movie.

Plot
Kermit the Frog throws a glamorous party at the Cocoanut Grove night club to celebrate the release of The Muppet Movie. Among the highlights of this special are:

 The Muppets and the celebrities arriving in the limousine.
 Sweetums, Timmy Monster, Doglion, Mean Mama, and the Mutations singing and dancing to "Hooray for Hollywood."
 Rita Moreno conducts a poolside interview with Miss Piggy with Scooter interrupting Miss Piggy by asking for some change for the pay phone so that he can call Frank Sinatra, Paul Newman, and Robert Redford on her behalf.
 Dick Van Dyke has a conversation with Sam the Eagle about the party. Despite Sam the Eagle showing his disapproval of the Hollywood ways, Dick then notices that the small book that Sam the Eagle has been carrying is an autograph book containing the names of the celebrities attending the party (ranging from Rudy Vallee to Gary Owens). Sam asks Dick if he's seen his favorite actor Walter Pidgeon when Dick tells him that Walter Pidgeon isn't at the party.
 Scooter calls Kermit the Frog into the kitchen where the Swedish Chef is doing his version of serving Swedish meatballs.
 The Peter Matz Orchestra plays "How High the Moon," featuring a solo by Zoot on saxophone. Rita Moreno is seen dancing with Floyd Pepper while asking how the Muppets are adjusting to Hollywood.
 Dick Van Dyke interviews Phyllis Diller while bringing up his encounter with Fozzie Bear in front of the Grauman's Chinese Theatre.
 Upon being introduced by Gary Owens, Miss Piggy arrives on a chaise carried by four bronzed bodybuilder pigs, to the strains of "The Most Beautiful Girl in the World" and proceeds to sing "[[Baby Face" backed by the pigs.
 Johnny Mathis sings "Never Before, Never Again" while backed up by Rowlf the Dog on piano.
 Miss Piggy shows some footage from The Muppet Movie to Rita Moreno despite Kermit's objection.
 Kermit the Frog tells Dick Van Dyke that the Muppets are staying at the Bide-A-Wee Motor Court since it is the only area that gives the Muppets a good rate and they allow livestock. Kermit and Dick laugh at this until Miss Piggy karate chops both of them.
 Dr. Teeth and the Electric Mayhem sing "Can You Picture That?"
 The Muppets and the celebrities do a dance on the dance floor.
 Dick Van Dyke serenades Miss Piggy with "You Ought to Be in Pictures."
 While Animal tries to get at Rita Moreno, Dick Van Dyke interviews Jim Henson who mentions how lyricist Paul Williams and composer Kenny Ascher came up with "The Rainbow Connection." Footage of the pair performing the song cuts to a scene with Kermit the Frog singing "The Rainbow Connection."
 Dick Van Dyke asks Peter Falk on what the Cocoanut Grove was like back in the 1930s.
 Rita Moreno does a Carmen Miranda dance routine backed up by the Mutations while forming a conga line with guests and Muppets alike.
 After most of the guests have left in the conga line, Kermit and the other Muppets do a reprise of "Hooray for Hollywood."

After the musical number, Kermit the Frog and the rest of the Muppets clean up the Cocoanut Grove upon Kermit stating that they can save money by cleaning it up themselves.

Notes
Later syndicated alongside The Muppet Show.

Cast
 Kenny Ascher - Himself
 Dick Van Dyke - Himself
 Jim Henson - Himself
 Johnny Mathis - Himself
 Rita Moreno - Herself
 Gary Owens - Himself/Announcer
 Paul Williams - Himself

Muppet performers
 Jim Henson - Kermit the Frog, Rowlf the Dog, Dr. Teeth, Swedish Chef, and Waldorf
 Frank Oz - Miss Piggy, Fozzie Bear, Animal, and Sam the Eagle
 Jerry Nelson - Floyd Pepper
 Richard Hunt - Scooter, Janice, and Statler
 Dave Goelz - Gonzo the Great and Zoot

Additional Muppets performed by Steve Whitmire and Kathryn Mullen.

Special guest appearances
The following celebrities appeared at the party:

 Steve Allen
 Loni Anderson
 Burt Bacharach
 Anne Bancroft
 Candice Bergen
 Mel Brooks
 LeVar Burton
 Gary Busey
 Red Buttons
 Ruth Buzzi
 James Coburn
 Dom DeLuise
 Phyllis Diller
 Charles Durning
 Peter Falk
 John Forsythe
 Don Knotts
 Cheryl Ladd
 Liberace
 Robert Mandan
 Jayne Meadows
 Ethel Merman
 Donny Most
 Richard Mulligan
 Donna Pescow
 Vincent Price
 Carl Reiner
 Christopher Reeve
 Gary Sandy
 Robert Stack
 Jean Stapleton
 Maureen Stapleton
 Charlene Tilton
 Raquel Welch

External links
 The Muppets Go Hollywood at Internet Movie Database
 The Muppets Go Hollywood at Muppet Wiki

The Muppets television specials
1979 television specials
1970s American television specials
CBS television specials